The Central Europe Pipeline System (alternatively Central European Pipeline System), or CEPS for short, is one of several NATO Pipeline Systems and is used to deliver fuel for air and ground vehicles around Europe. Originally conceived for military purposes, it was to aid in safe and quick distribution of fuel for military purposes around Europe. Besides these host countries, the system is also used by the United States military.

Main feeder routes are:
Marseille–Lyon–Langres–Nancy–Zweibrücken
Amsterdam–Liège–Trier-Karlsruhe
Le Havre/Dunkirk–Cambrai–Aachen/Reims–Belfort

A similar system exists for the Northern European countries, known as the Northern European Pipeline System (NEPS).

History

The pipeline system was founded in the late 1950s by NATO being funded as part of the NATO Common Infrastructure Program, with the various participating countries already having some of the infrastructure and capabilities required to operate such a system.

In the 1980s, the pipeline was attacked several times by terrorist organizations. The Belgian communist terrorist organisation Communist Combatant Cells carried out five bombings against the pipeline on 11 December 1984, and one more attack on 6 December 1985. Earlier that year, in April 1985, a bomb attack was carried out against a part of the pipeline in Southern-Germany by Red Army Faction sympathisers.

At the end of the Cold War the system was significantly reduced as various military airports that used the system were closed, such as Bitburg Air Base and Soesterberg Air Base.

Since 1959, excess capacity of the pipeline may be used by civilian users. Currently, around 90% of the fuel transported through the system is for civilian users, customers including various large European airports such as Amsterdam Airport Schiphol, Brussels Airport, Frankfurt am Main Airport, Luxembourg Airport, Cologne Bonn Airport and Zürich Airport.

The operating company for German territory is Fernleitungsbetriebsgesellschaft GmbH (FBG) headquartered in Bad Godesberg and established in 1956. FBG is a parent of Industrieverwaltungsgesellschaft (IVG). In war times, it is operated by the armed forces of the NATO countries where the part of the pipeline is located.

For Belgium, the operating company Belgian Pipeline Organisation (BPO) is headquartered in Leuven. BPO is part of the Belgian Defense.

References

Energy infrastructure completed in 1959
Military logistics of NATO
Oil pipelines in Belgium
Oil pipelines in France
Oil pipelines in Germany
Oil pipelines in Luxembourg
Oil pipelines in the Netherlands
Refined oil product pipelines